Mouse Island may refer to:
 Mouse Island, Bermuda, an island of Bermuda
 Mouse Island, Ohio, a private island  in Lake Erie in Ohio, United States
 Mausinsel ("Mouse island") an island in the Wörthsee lake in Bavaria, Germany
 Mouse Island, a fictional island in the Geronimo Stilton book series.

See also
 Island mouse, a species of rodent in the family Nesomyidae found only in Madagascar